PenAir Flight 3296 (marketed as Alaska Airlines Flight 3296 under a codeshare agreement with Alaska Airlines) was a domestic scheduled flight from Ted Stevens Anchorage International Airport in Anchorage, Alaska, to Unalaska Airport on Amaknak Island in the Aleutian Chain of Alaska. On October 17, 2019, the Saab 2000 operating the flight overran the runway after landing at its destination airport. Of the 42 passengers and crew on board, one passenger was fatally injured when a propeller blade penetrated the fuselage, one was seriously injured and ten suffered minor injuries. The 24-year-old aircraft was substantially damaged during the accident and written off.

Accident

On the day of the accident, the aircraft departed from Anchorage at 15:15 AST and was due to land at Unalaska two hours and 15 minutes later. While descending toward Unalaska, the crew received clearance for a RNAV approach to Runway 13, a  runway. The aircraft became unstable and a go-around was executed. The flight returned for a visual approach onto Runway 13.

The crew decided to continue with the landing and touched down at 17:40. The aircraft landed  down the runway with reverse thrust and wheel-braking inputs by the captain. When the aircraft reached , maximum braking was applied. As an overrun was imminent, the pilots steered the aircraft right to avoid going into the water past the runway end. Attempts to stop on the paved runway surface failed, and the aircraft crossed a section of grass and then broke through a chain perimeter fence and crossed a ditch. The aircraft struck a large rock, crossed a public roadway and finally came to a stop on the shore of a small lake. The port wing struck a  signal post. This caused the port-side (left) propeller to shatter, sending debris and large pieces of the propeller blade into the fuselage. One of the blades was found inside the cabin. Two passengers were critically injured and another 10 had to receive medical care. One of the critically injured passengers died a day later.

Investigation
On the day of the accident, the National Transportation Safety Board (NTSB) launched an investigation. Two years later, on November 2, 2021, the final report was released, which stated that the accident had been caused by "the landing gear manufacturer's incorrect wiring of the wheel speed transducer harnesses on the left main landing gear during overhaul." Saab's design of wire harnesses, the Federal Aviation Administration (FAA) authorizing Unalaska Airport to operate the Saab 2000 without taking the runway safety area into consideration first, and the flight crew's decision to land in a tailwind that exceeded Saab's limits (which the NTSB labeled as inappropriate) were also factors in the accident.

See also
 Swiss International Air Lines Flight 850
 List of accidents and incidents involving commercial aircraft
 2019 in aviation

References

External links
 NTSB investigation docket

2019 in Alaska
Aviation accidents and incidents in 2019
Aviation accidents and incidents in Alaska
accidents and incidents involving the Saab 2000
Airliner accidents and incidents caused by maintenance errors
Airliner accidents and incidents caused by design or manufacturing errors
Airliner accidents and incidents caused by pilot error
October 2019 events in the United States